Prom Night is a 1980 slasher film directed by Paul Lynch and written by William Gray. Jamie Lee Curtis and Leslie Nielsen star. The film's plot follows a group of high school seniors who are targeted at their prom by a masked killer, seeking vengeance for the accidental death of a young girl (six years earlier). The film features supporting performances from Casey Stevens, Eddie Benton, Mary Beth Rubens and Michael Tough.

Prom Night was filmed in Toronto, Ontario, Canada in late 1979 on a budget of $1.5 million. Distributed by Astral Films in Canada and AVCO Embassy Pictures in the United States, the film was released on July 18, 1980 in select cinemas and was an immediate financial success. The film's theatrical release platform was expanded to major USA cities such as Los Angeles in California and New York City in New York in August where the film was again met with high box-office receipts. At the time, the film was AVCO Embassy's most financially successful release, breaking weekend records in Los Angeles, Philadelphia and New England.

By the end of the film's theatrical run, Prom Night had grossed $15 million in the United States and was Canada's highest-earning horror film of 1980. Critical reaction to the film was varied and dismissed for the film's depictions of violence against young women, while others alternately praising Prom Night for the film's more muted violent content. Prom Night received some critical accolades, garnering Genie Award nominations for editing and also for the leading performance of Jamie Lee Curtis. An alternative cut of the film was popularly aired on American and Canadian television networks in 1981.

In the intervening years, Prom Night has accrued a substantial cult following for the film's horror content and also for the film's soundtrack album (which was released by RCA Records in Japan in 1980). Some film scholars have cited Prom Night as one of the most influential slasher films of the period. Several companies released Prom Night on video and the film was also released on DVD by Anchor Bay Entertainment in 1998. A remastered Blu-ray edition of the film was released by Synapse Films in 2014.

Plot
In 1974, 11-year-olds Wendy Richards, Jude Cunningham, Kelly Lynch, and Nick McBride play hide-and-seek in an abandoned convent. When 10-year-old Robin Hammond tries to join them, the group starts teasing her, repeating "Kill! Kill! Kill!", and leading to a scared Robin accidentally falling to her death through a second-story window. The children make a pact not to tell anyone what happened and keep the incident a secret and they leave. Just then, the shadow of an unseen person who witnessed Robin's death crosses over her body.

Six years later in 1980, Robin's family attend her memorial on the anniversary of her death. Robin's teenage sister, Kim, and fraternal twin brother, Alex, are preparing for the school prom to be held that evening. Kelly, Jude, and Wendy begin receiving anonymous obscene phone calls, while Nick ignores his ringing phone.

Kim and Nick are now dating and plan on attending prom together. Jude is asked by goofy jokester Seymour "Slick" Crane, who she meets by chance. Kelly is going with Drew, her boyfriend. Wendy—Nick's ex-girlfriend—asks school bully Lou to the prom with the sole purpose of embarrassing Nick and her rival Kim. In the changing room after gym class, Kim and Kelly discover the locker room mirror cracked with a shard missing. Later, Wendy, Jude and Kelly each find their yearbook photos stabbed with a piece of glass. Meanwhile, Kim and Alex's father (also the school principal) learns that the sex offender blamed for Robin's death has escaped from a psychiatric facility. Lt. McBride, Nick's father, investigates his disappearance.

During the senior prom, Kelly and Drew make out in the changing room, but Kelly, a virgin, refuses to have sex and Drew angrily leaves. As Kelly gets dressed, an unidentified figure wearing a ski mask and all-black clothing approaches her and slits her throat with a mirror shard. Jude and Slick have sex and smoke marijuana in his van parked outside school grounds. They are attacked by the masked killer, who stabs Jude in the throat. Slick struggles with the killer, who jumps from the vehicle before Slick drives off a cliff to his death. Staking out the prom, McBride is informed that the sex offender blamed for Robin's death has been caught.

Now wielding an ax, the killer confronts and chases Wendy through the school. Evading the killer several times, she screams when she discovers Kelly's body in a storage room and is hacked to death. The alcoholic school janitor, Sykes, witnesses Wendy's murder and attempts to notify the school staff, but they dismiss it as a drunken rant. Meanwhile, Kim and Nick prepare to be crowned prom king and queen, but Lou and his lackeys tie up Nick, and Lou takes his crown. Mistaking him for Nick, the killer approaches Lou from behind and decapitates him. Lou's severed head rolls onto the dance floor, sending the prom-goers fleeing in horror.

Kim finds Nick and frees him. As they prepare to escape, they are confronted by the killer who attacks Nick but not Kim. In the ensuing brawl, Kim strikes the killer's head with the ax. She and the killer stare at each other and Kim realizes his identity. The killer runs outside where the police have arrived. The killer collapses and is then revealed to be Alex, who explains to Kim that he witnessed their sister's death, and that Jude, Kelly, Wendy and Nick were responsible. He cries out Robin's name before dying in Kim's arms. Kim cries over the death of another sibling.

Cast
 Leslie Nielsen as Mr. Hammond
 Jamie Lee Curtis as Kimberly "Kim" Hammond
 Casey Stevens as Nick McBride
 Eddie Benton as Wendy Richards
 Michael Tough as Alex Hammond
 Antoinette Bower as Mrs. Hammond
 Robert A. Silverman as Mr. Sykes
 Mary Beth Rubens as Kelly Lynch
 Pita Oliver as Vicki
 David Mucci as Lou Farmer
 Joy Thompson as Jude Cunningham
 George Touliatos as Lt. McBride
 Melanie Morse as Henri-Anne
 David Bolt as Weller
 Jeff Wincott as Drew Shinnick
 David Gardner as Dr. Fairchild
 Sheldon Rybowski as Seymour "Slick" Crane

Production

Development
Director Paul Lynch developed Prom Night after a meeting with producer Irwin Yablans, who had previously produced Halloween (1978). Lynch had wanted to work on a horror film, and had initially pitched Don't Go See the Doctor, a film about a physician who murders his patients. Yablans instead suggested that Lynch utilize a holiday as a basis for the film, which resulted in Lynch deciding to build the premise around the event of the high school prom. Writer Robert Guza Jr., a University of Southern California film student of whom Lynch was an acquaintance, had written a story about a group of teenagers whose involvement in a tragic event as children came back to haunt them. Guza's story was then adapted and incorporated into the film as the central premise and motive for the film's villain.

While attending a Telefilm Canada event in Los Angeles, Lynch met producer Peter Simpson, to whom he pitched the idea. "I said, 'I'm working on this thing that is called Prom Night," Lynch recalled. "[Peter] said, 'Look, let's get together and talk.' This was on a Thursday. On Monday he read the treatment, came back and said, 'We'll make a deal to develop a script and do Prom Night.' And that's how Prom Night came about." The film was an international co-production between Canada and the United States, and was made under a tax shelter for American film productions shot in Canada.

Casting
In the documentary Going to Pieces: The Rise and Fall of the Slasher Film (2006), Lynch stated he was having difficulty securing financing for the film until Jamie Lee Curtis signed onto the project; she received a salary of $30,000 for her appearance in the film. According to the producer of Prom Night, Eve Plumb (from television's The Brady Bunch) originally auditioned for the role of Kim Hammond, but was passed over after Jamie Lee Curtis' manager contacted Paul Lynch about her starring in the film. Lynch was enthusiastic about casting Curtis, as she had established herself in the horror genre portraying Laurie Strode in Halloween (1978). After auditioning for producer Simpson—which included a dance audition for the film's dance numbers—Curtis was officially cast in the role. Lynch recalled, "For whatever reason, Peter [Simpson] made her jump through hoops, but she wanted it, and she got it." According to Curtis, Prom Night was the first project in which she "made any money."

Leslie Nielsen, an established film and television actor, was cast as Kim Hammond's father; this role marks one of the last serious films for Nielsen, as he spent the remainder of his career performing in comedies. Lynch sought Nielsen for the role as he was one of Canada's "most-experienced actors." Opposite Nielsen, portraying his character's wife, is Antoinette Bower, whom Lynch had seen on numerous Canadian television programs. The majority of the film's supporting actors and actresses were stage performers and recent theater graduates from the University of Toronto. Michael Tough, a 17-year-old actor who was cast as Kim's younger brother, Alex, recalled that he and Curtis spent an afternoon together shopping to become familiar with each other and establish a sibling-like dynamic. Mary Beth Rubens, who appears as Kim's ill-fated friend, Kelly Lynch, had recently graduated from the Montreal Theatre School when she was cast in the role. Joy Thompson was cast as Jude Cunningham, another of Kim's friends stalked by the killer.

Filming

Prom Night was filmed over twenty-four days in Toronto, Ontario, Canada, with principal photography beginning August 13, 1979, and completing September 13. The majority of the crew were recent graduates from film schools in Canada. Don Mills Collegiate Institute served as the main school location, while the Langstaff Jail Farm in Richmond Hill was used for the abandoned building featured prominently in the beginning of the film. Art director Reuben Freed had wanted to take advantage of Toronto's Victorian architecture, and felt that the Langstaff building had an appropriate Gothic appearance.

Because of the way the film is structured, the majority of the film's cast spent little time together collectively, as each appear in their own individual subplots leading up to (and during) the prom. The initial shoot took place in the school, as the crew had to complete before school was back in session in late August, while the remainder of the shoot was spent filming the sequences at the various characters' homes. The filming of the dance numbers, which were choreographed by Lynch's sister, were completed without the use of a Steadicam. Lynch stated that he was "amazed they turned out as well as they did", as the crew had little experience with filming such sequences.

Special effects
In terms of on-screen violence, Lynch had intentionally devised the film to have a minimal amount of gore, as he did not want it to be overtly gratuitous; however, the distributor, Avco Embassy Pictures, mandated that they include some graphic violence, resulting in the on-screen beheading of Lou Farmer in the finale. In order to make the sequence appear realistic, the special effects team decided to build a prop floor through which the actor, David Mucci, could place his head, creating the illusion of his severed head lying on the floor. For the filming of this sequence itself, a dummy head was crafted via prosthetics, and moulded around a prop skull.

Music

The Prom Night score and soundtrack was composed by Paul Zaza and Carl Zittrer, with additional writing by Bill Crutchfield and James Powell. Director Lynch sought Zittrer after hearing his compositions in Black Christmas (1974). The soundtrack of Prom Night includes several disco songs which are featured prominently in the film's prom scenes. Originally, the film was shot with the actors dancing to then-popular tracks by Gloria Gaynor, Donna Summer, France Joli Patrick Hernandez and Cheryl Lynn, but, according to Zaza, the publishing rights to the songs were far outside the film's budget. Under orders from producer Peter Simpson, Zaza wrote a series of original disco songs over a five-day period which closely copied the original tracks that were intended to be used in the film. This resulted in a copyright lawsuit for $10 million, which was eventually settled for $50,000.

An official release of the Prom Night soundtrack was issued in Japan in 1980, featuring both the musical score as well as the original disco songs featured in the film. Other "source" music was provided by Canadian band Highstreet.

Release

Promotion
After production wrapped, Paramount Pictures expressed interest in distributing the movie. However, they only wanted to open it in 300 theaters whereas Avco Embassy purchased the film at the Cannes film market in May 1980 (instead, Paramount released another independent slasher film, Friday the 13th, which premiered two months before Prom Night as an "exact replica of [the trailer] for Carrie (1976)." The distributor issued a total of 250 prints of the film for theatrical distribution.

On July 25, 1980, it was reported that Avco Embassy Pictures was planning a promotional tour for the film, which would have Curtis appearing at openings for the film in various U.S. cities, such as New York City, Washington, D.C., Baltimore, Cincinnati, Denver and Los Angeles. Additionally, 10,000 promotional "scream pillows" were to be distributed at screenings to help quiet the outbursts of theater patrons.

Box office
Given a limited release in the United States on July 18, 1980, Prom Night had financial success as a sleeper hit. During its opening week in select cities (including Chicago, Milwaukee, Louisville, and several cities in Texas), it grossed $1,189,636 at the U.S. box office, and was subsequently slated for a staggered platform release.

Its theatrical run expanded on August 15, 1980, to New York City and Los Angeles, and included select midnight screenings. During its opening week runs in New York City and Los Angeles, the film earned a combined $1.3 million, and marked Avco Embassy's highest-grossing Los Angeles opening to date, as well as breaking weekend records in Philadelphia and New England. The film continued to prove financially successful through Labor Day, earning $2.1 million over the holiday weekend. By October 1980, the film had grossed a sum of $12 million. The film premiered in Canada through Astral Films on September 12, 1980.

By the end of its theatrical run, Prom Night grossed a total of $14.8 million at the U.S. box office. It earned an additional $6 million in rentals during its home video release.

Critical response

Contemporaneous 
Upon release in 1980, Prom Night received mostly negative reviews from critics, with frequent comparisons to Halloween (1978) and Carrie (1976). Gene Siskel of the Chicago Tribune referred to the film as a "watered-down cross between Carrie and Halloween", though he noted it was "not as violent as one might expect, based on those frightening ads of a masked man holding a phallic knife... You would think that Prom Night was another one of those hideous attacks-on-promiscuous-women pictures. It's not. Gender makes no difference in this routine revenge film." The film's advertising campaign was criticized by Siskel and Roger Ebert in a September 18, 1980 episode of Sneak Previews, cited among a glut of other violent slasher films released the same year that thematized "Women in Danger." Siskel and Ebert used the episode to criticize the advertising campaigns for several films, including Don't Answer the Phone, Hell Night and Prom Night: "[These] ads have been saturating television for the past two years," said Ebert, "and the summer and fall of 1980 are the worst yet."

Variety noted that the film "[borrows] shamelessly from Carrie and any number of gruesome exploitationers pic [from a story by Robert Gunza (sic) Jr.] manages to score a few horrific points amid a number of sagging moments." Vincent Canby of The New York Times gave the film a middling review, writing: "Prom Night, the Canadian film that opened yesterday at the Loews State 2 and other theaters, is a comparatively genteel hybrid, part shock melodrama, like Halloween, and part mystery, though it's less a whodunit than a who's-doing-it." He also praised the film's restrained violence, writing that director Lynch "chooses to underplay the bloody spectacle. This isn't to say that there aren't some sticky moments, including one not especially convincing beheading, but that more often than not the camera cuts away, or the screen goes discreetly gray, before the audience is drenched in gore. This may or may not be the reason that the audience with which I saw the film yesterday booed at the end." Jack Mathews of the Detroit Free Press also drew comparisons to Halloween and Carrie, though deeming it "not as effective as either."

Kevin Thomas of the Los Angeles Times deemed the film "an efficient rather than stylish Canadian-made horror picture that mercifully lets you complete its grislier moments in your imagination. Even so, its various jolts should be sufficient to satisfy scare-show fans." The Atlanta Constitution reviewed the film favorably, deeming it a "surprisingly good scare film. At least the murderer actually has a motive, for a change. If nothing else, it proves there's still a line between a respectable horror film and gross exploitation." The News-Press wrote: "If Carrie and Friday the 13th weren't enough for you, this will satisfy your appetite for youth, gore and chills." The Montreal Gazettes Bruce Bailey praised Curtis's performance but criticized the film's lengthy exposition, noting that "it takes rather long to get down to the business of delivering a few shocks."

Modern assessment 
On the review aggregator website Rotten Tomatoes, Prom Night holds a 48% approval rating based on 23 critic reviews and an average rating of 4.60/10. The consensus reads: "Horror aficionados might have a ball with Prom Night, but a lack of mystery and inability to capitalize on the dance hall setting makes for a generic night of mayhem.” AllMovies review of the film was generally negative, but wrote that it "utilizes a surprising amount of skill both behind and in front of the camera as it goes through its paces".

In a review published by Time Out, the film was called "a sincere Halloween rip-off which takes time out to milk Carrie, Saturday Night Fever, and all those B-feature 'lust and rivalry' high school sagas", but praised Jamie Lee Curtis's performance, writing: "Curtis is superb as Miss Naturally Popular and Prom Queen-to-be, isolated in empty high school corridors." TV Guide gave the film one out of four stars, writing: "Curtis disco-dancing and wonderful moments such as when the severed head of a victim rolls across the dance floor. Prom Night is better than most slasher movies, mainly because it's funnier."

Scholar Richard Nowell considers Prom Night one of the most influential slasher films of the 1980s.

Accolades

Television broadcast
In late 1980, Canada's CTV Network paid a record $200,000 for three television airings of Prom Night. The film was also acquired for television broadcast in the United States on NBC, who purchased two prime time showings of the film for $3.25 million. In order to slightly lengthen the film after nudity was excised for television airings, an alternate cut of Prom Night was crafted by editor Michael MacLaverty. The television version of the film features some additional scenes that were excised from the original theatrical cut, as well as extended sequences that had been truncated. Among these were a scene in which Mr. and Mrs. Hammond meet with Dr. Fairchild, a psychologist evaluating Mrs. Hammond; three brief scenes featuring Adele, a temporary school secretary who is encountered by Mr. Hammond and Kim, respectively; a sequence in which Jude, Vicki and Kim pass notes during biology class; and Kim returning home and speaking briefly with her mother.

Seven months after its theatrical premiere, the television cut of Prom Night premiered on NBC, on February 22, 1981.

Home media
Prom Night has had an inconsistent release history on home video. It was originally released on in 1981 on Laserdisc and VHS and Betamax videocassettes by MCA Universal in North America, at the beginnings of home video popularity, licensed directly from then-production company SimCom, who had licensed theatrical distribution to Avco-Embassy. In 1988, it was re-released on VHS by Virgin Vision in tandem with the in-name-only sequel Hello Mary Lou; Prom Night II, which Virgin handled through a separate deal with that film's then-distributor The Samuel Goldwyn Company. In 1997, the film was re-released again, by Anchor Bay Entertainment, in both standard and "collector's" editions. It was then released on DVD by Anchor Bay on February 18, 1998 with a re-mastered widescreen transfer, and was one of the company's first DVD releases. By 2000, Anchor Bay's DVD release had gone out of print and became a rarity, with fans starting online petitions for a re-release.

In 2004, Alliance Atlantis released the film on DVD, but the film was sourced from an extremely dark, low-quality VHS transfer, which resulted in some of the film's darker scenes being nearly illegible; this transfer was also used for Platinum Disc's full-screen DVD edition of the movie for the United States.

In September 2007, Echo Bridge Home Entertainment re-released the film on DVD in the United States in a completely re-mastered print from a PAL source, which was given an uncorrected transfer to NTSC. Due to the uncorrected transfer, the film is slightly "sped up," which, though mostly unnoticeable to the naked eye, reduced the film's run time by several minutes.

On September 9, 2014, the film was released on Blu-ray and DVD by Synapse Films, featuring a restored print from the original film negatives, as well as featuring a documentary as well as outtakes, original promotional material, and deleted scenes from the network television cut as bonus material.

Related works
Prom Night was followed by three sequels, each of which has little in common with the 1980 film, aside from all being set at Hamilton High School. In 2008, a reboot was released, which also bears little resemblance to the 1980 film.

References

Sources

External links
 
 

Prom Night (film series)
1980 films
1980 horror films
1980 independent films
1980s Canadian films
1980s English-language films
1980s exploitation films
1980s high school films
1980s slasher films
1980s teen horror films
Abandoned buildings and structures in fiction
Canadian exploitation films
Canadian films about revenge
Canadian high school films
Canadian independent films
Canadian slasher films
Disco films
Embassy Pictures films
English-language Canadian films
Films about children
Films about mass murder
Films about proms
Films about school violence
Films about twins
Films directed by Paul Lynch
Films scored by Paul Zaza
Films set in 1974
Films set in 1980
Films shot in Toronto
Fratricide in fiction
English-language horror films